John Platt may refer to:

 John Platt (settler) (1632–1705), early settler of Norwalk, Connecticut
 John Platt (sculptor) (1728–1810), English sculptor
 John Platt (MP) (1817–1872), English manufacturer of textile machinery and Liberal politician
 John Milton Platt (1840–1919), physician and political figure in Ontario, Canada
 John Platt (artist) (1886–1967), English artist
 John R. Platt (1918–1992), American physicist and biophysicist
 John Talbot Platt (published from 1960s, died 1990), Australian linguist who documented the Kokatha dialect
 John Platt (footballer) (born 1954), English goalkeeper
 John Platt (computer scientist) (born 1963), Google scientist

See also 
 Platt Brothers
 John Platts (disambiguation)
 John Platts-Mills (1906–2001), British Labour Party politician